Pakur Assembly constituency is an assembly constituency in  the Indian state of Jharkhand.

Overview
Pakur Assembly constituency covers: Pakur Police Station in Pakur district; and Barharwa Police Station in Sahibganj district.

Pakur Assembly constituency is part of Rajmahal (Lok Sabha constituency).

Members of Assembly

See also
Pakur block
Barharwa (community development block)
List of states of India by type of legislature

References

Assembly constituencies of Jharkhand